Bemidbar, BeMidbar,  B'midbar, Bamidbar, or Bamidbor ( — Hebrew for "in the wilderness of" [Sinai], the fifth overall and first distinctive word in the parashah), is the 34th weekly Torah portion (parashah) in the annual Jewish cycle of Torah reading and the first in the Book of Numbers. The parashah tells of the census and the priests' duties.
It constitutes . The parashah is made up of 7,393 Hebrew letters, 1,823 Hebrew words, 159 verses, and 263 lines in a Torah Scroll (Sefer Torah). Jews generally read it in May or early June.

Readings

First reading — Numbers 1:1–19
In the first reading (aliyah), in the wilderness, in the second month of the second year following the Exodus from Egypt, God directed Moses to take a census of the Israelite men age 20 years and up, "all those in Israel who are able to bear arms." The heads of each of the tribes or army divisions are named.

Second reading — Numbers 1:20–54
In the second reading (aliyah), the census showed the following populations by tribe:
Reuben: 46,500
Simeon: 59,300
Gad: 45,650
Judah: 74,600
Issachar: 54,400
Zebulun: 57,400
Ephraim: 40,500
Manasseh: 32,200
Benjamin: 35,400
Dan: 62,700
Asher: 41,500
Naphtali: 53,400

totaling 603,550 in all.
God told Moses not to enroll the Levites, but to put them in charge of carrying, assembling, tending to, and guarding the Tabernacle and its furnishings. Any outsider who encroached on the Tabernacle was to be put to death.

Third reading — Numbers 2:1–34
In the third reading (aliyah), God told Moses that the Israelites were to encamp by tribe as follows:
around the Tabernacle: Levi
on the front, or east side: Judah, Issachar, and Zebulun
on the south: Reuben, Simeon, and Gad
on the west: Ephraim, Manasseh, and Benjamin
on the north: Dan, Asher, and Naphtali.

Fourth reading — Numbers 3:1–13
In the fourth reading (aliyah), God instructed Moses to place the Levites in attendance upon Aaron to serve him and the priests. God took the Levites in place of all the firstborn among the Israelites, whom God consecrated when God killed the firstborn in Egypt.

Fifth reading — Numbers 3:14–39
In the fifth reading (aliyah), God then told Moses to record by ancestral house and by clan the Levite men from the age of one month up, and he did so. The Levites divided by their ancestral houses, based on the sons of Levi: Gershon, Kohath, and Merari.

The Gershonites, numbered 7,500, camped behind the Tabernacle, to the west, and had charge of the Tabernacle, the tent, its covering, the screen for the entrance of the tent, the hangings of the enclosure, the screen for the entrance of the enclosure that surrounded the Tabernacle, and the altar.
The Kohathites, numbered 8,600, camped along the south side of the Tabernacle, and had charge of the Ark, the table, the lampstand, the altars, the sacred utensils, and the screen.
The Merarites, numbered 6,200, camped along the north side of the Tabernacle, and had charge of the planks of the Tabernacle, its bars, posts, sockets, and furnishings, and the posts around the enclosure and their sockets, pegs, and cords.
Moses, Aaron, and Aaron's sons (who were also descended from Kohath) camped in front of the Tabernacle, on the east.

The total number of the Levites came to 22,000.

Sixth reading — Numbers 3:40–51
In the sixth reading (aliyah), God instructed Moses to record every firstborn male of the Israelites aged one month old and upwards, and they came to 22,273. God told Moses to take the 22,000 Levites for God in exchange for all the firstborn among the Israelites, and the Levites' cattle in exchange for the Israelites' cattle. To redeem the 273 Israelite firstborn over and above the number of the Levites, God instructed Moses to take five shekels a head and to give the money to the priests.

Seventh reading — Numbers 4:1–20
In the seventh reading (aliyah), God then directed Moses and Aaron to take a separate census of the Kohathites between the ages of 30 and 50, who were to perform tasks for the Tent of Meeting. The Kohathites had responsibility for the most sacred objects. (Parashat Naso reports the number of working-age Kohathites counted.)

At the breaking of camp, Aaron and his sons were to take down the Ark, the table of display, the lampstand, and the service vessels, and cover them all with cloths and skins. Only when Aaron and his sons had finished covering the sacred objects would the Kohathites come and lift them. Aaron's son Eleazar had responsibility for the lighting oil, the aromatic incense, the regular meal offering, the anointing oil, and all the consecrated things in the Tabernacle. God charged Moses and Aaron to take care not to let the Kohathites die because they went inside and witnessed the dismantling of the sanctuary.

Readings according to the triennial cycle
Jews who read the Torah according to the triennial cycle of Torah reading read the parashah according to the following schedule:

In inner-biblical interpretation
The parashah has parallels or is discussed in these Biblical sources:

Numbers chapter 1
 begins, "On the first day of the second month, in the second year following the exodus from the land of Egypt." At the same time, the ordination events of  took place. And  then reports that the second Passover for those unable to participate in the first Passover would commence "in the second month, on the fourteenth day of the month." Thus, the events beginning with  would have taken place shortly after the setting up of the Tabernacle, the chieftain's offerings, the ordination and inaugural ceremonies of the Tabernacle, the incident of Nadab and Abihu, and the first Passover, but shortly before the second Passover. 

Three times in this parashah the Torah lists the tribes, and each time the Torah lists the tribes in a different order:

Numbers chapters 3–4

 refers to duties of the Levites.  reports that Levites taught the law.  reports that they served as judges. And  reports that they blessed God's name.  reports that of 38,000 Levite men age 30 and up, 24,000 were in charge of the work of the Temple in Jerusalem, 6,000 were officers and magistrates, 4,000 were gatekeepers, and 4,000 praised God with instruments and song.  reports that King David installed Levites as singers with musical instruments, harps, lyres, and cymbals, and  reports that David appointed Levites to minister before the Ark, to invoke, to praise, and to extol God. And  reports at the inauguration of Solomon's Temple, Levites sang dressed in fine linen, holding cymbals, harps, and lyres, to the east of the altar, and with them 120 priests blew trumpets.  reports that Levites of the sons of Kohath and of the sons of Korah extolled God in song. Eleven Psalms identify themselves as of the Korahites.

In classical rabbinic interpretation
The parashah is discussed in these rabbinic sources from the era of the Mishnah and the Talmud:

Numbers chapter 1
Rava taught that when people open themselves to everyone like a wilderness, God gives them the Torah. Similarly, a Midrash taught that those who do not throw themselves open to all like a wilderness cannot acquire wisdom and Torah. The Sages inferred from  that the Torah was given to the accompaniment of fire, water, and wilderness. And the giving of the Torah was marked by these three features to show that as these are free to all people, so are the words of the Torah; as  states, "everyone who thirsts, come for water." Another Midrash taught that if the Torah had been given to the Israelites in the land of Israel, the tribe in whose territory it was given would have said that it had a prior claim to the Torah, so God gave it in the wilderness, so that all should have an equal claim to it. Another Midrash taught that as people neither sow nor till the wilderness, so those who accept the yoke of the Torah are relieved of the yoke of earning a living; and as the wilderness does not yield any taxes from crops, so scholars are free in this world. And another Midrash taught that the Torah was given in the wilderness because they preserve the Torah who keep themselves separate like a wilderness.

The Gemara noted that  happened in "the second month, in the second year," while  happened "in the first month of the second year," and asked why the Torah presented the chapters beginning at  before , out of chronological order. Rav Menasia bar Tahlifa said in Rav's name that this proved that there is no chronological order in the Torah.

Rav Nachman bar Yitzchak noted that both  and  begin, "And the Lord spoke to Moses in the wilderness of Sinai," and deduced that just as  happened (in the words of that verse) "on the first day of the second month," so too  happened at the beginning of the month. And as  addressed the Passover offering, which the Israelites were to bring on the 14th of the month, the Gemara concluded that one should expound the laws of a holiday two weeks before the holiday.

A Midrash taught that when God is about to make Israel great, God explicitly states the place, the day, the month, the year, and the era, as  says, "in the wilderness of Sinai, in the tent of meeting, on the first day of the second month, in the second year after they were come out of the land of Egypt." The Midrash continued that God then said to the Israelites (rereading ): "Raise to greatness all the congregation of the children of Israel" (interpreting "raise the head" —  — to mean "raise to greatness").

A king married a wife and did not give her a legal marriage contract. He then sent her away without giving her a bill of divorce. He did the same to a second wife and a third, giving them neither a marriage contract nor a bill of divorce. Then he saw a poor, well-born orphan girl whom he desired to marry. He told his best man (shoshbin) not to deal with her as with the previous ones, as she was well-born, modest in her actions, and worthy. The king directed his aide to draw up a marriage contract for her, stating the period of seven years, the year, the month, the day of the month, and the region, in the same way that  writes about Esther, "So Esther was taken to king Ahasuerus into his house royal in the tenth month, which is the month Tevet, in the seventh year of his reign." So God did not state when God created the generation of the Flood and did not state when God removed them from the world, except insofar as  reports, "on the same day were all the fountains of the great deep broken up." Similarly, Scripture does not indicate when God created the generation of the Dispersal after the Tower of Babel or the generation of Egypt, or when either generation passed away. But when Israel appeared, God told Moses that God would not act towards them as God did towards those earlier generations, as the Israelites were descendants of Abraham, Isaac, and Jacob. God instructed that Moses record for them the precise month, day of the month, year, region, and city in which God lifted them up. Therefore,  says: "And the Lord spoke to Moses in the wilderness of Sinai," indicating the region; "in the tent of meeting," indicating the province; "in the second year," indicating the precise year; "in the second month," indicating the precise month; "on the first day of the month," indicating the precise day of the month; and "after they were come out of Egypt," indicating the era.

Reading , "The Lord spoke to Moses in the wilderness of Sinai," Midrash Tanḥuma explained that before the Israelites erected the Tabernacle, God spoke to Moses from the burning bush, as  says, "God called to him out of the bush." After that, God spoke to Moses in Midian, as  says, "The Lord said to Moses in Midian." After that, God spoke to Moses in Egypt, as  says, "The Lord said to Moses and Aaron in the land of Egypt." After that, God spoke to Moses at Sinai, as  says, "The Lord spoke to Moses in the wilderness of Sinai." Once the Israelites erected the Tabernacle, God said, "modesty is beautiful," as  says, "and to walk humbly with your God,” and God began talking with Moses in the Tent of Meeting.

Rabbi Phinehas the son of Idi noted that  says, "Lift up the head of all the congregation of the children of Israel," not "Exalt the head" or "Magnify the head," but "Lift up the head," like a man who says to the executioner, "Take off the head of So-and-So." Thus  conveys a hidden message with the expression "Lift up the head." If the Israelites were worthy, they would rise to greatness, with the words "Lift up" having the same meaning as in  when it says (as Joseph interpreted the chief butler's dream), "Pharaoh shall lift up your head, and restore you to your office." If they were not worthy, they would all die, with the words "Lift up" having the same meaning as in  when it says (as Joseph interpreted the chief baker's dream), "Pharaoh shall lift up your head from off you, and shall hang you on a tree."

Midrash Tanḥuma taught that the Israelites were counted on ten occasions: (1) when they went down to Egypt, (2) when they went up out of Egypt, (3) at the first census in Numbers, (4) at the second census in Numbers, (5) once for the banners, (6) once in the time of Joshua for the division of the land of Israel, (7) once by Saul, (8) a second time by Saul, (9) once by David, and (10) once in the time of Ezra.

Rav Aha bar Jacob taught that for the purposes of numbering fighting men (as in ), a man over 60 years of age was excluded just as was one under 20 years of age.

In , God told Moses and Aaron to count "all those in Israel who are able to bear arms."

A Midrash explained that Moses numbered the Israelites like a shepherd to whom an owner entrusted a flock by number. When the shepherd came to the end of the shepherd's time, on returning them, the shepherd had to count them again. When Israel left Egypt, God entrusted the Israelites to Moses by number, as  reports, "And the Lord spoke to Moses in the wilderness of Sinai . . . ‘Take the sum of all the congregation of the children of Israel.’" And  records that "the children of Israel journeyed from Rameses to Succoth, about 600,000 men on foot," demonstrating that Moses took responsibility for the Israelites in Egypt by number.

A Midrash likened God's desire to count the Israelites to a vendor who had a sales-bundle of glass stones to bring to market, but would not note their number, as they were just glass. But the vendor also had a sales-bundle of precious pearls, and would take them and bring them out by number and put them away by number. Similarly, God considers Israel to be God's children, and therefore counts them all the time.

Therefore, God commanded the Israelites to be counted, because an entity that is quantified by counting does not lose its identity and impact when outnumbered a thousand to one.

In the Talmud, Rabbi Isaac taught that it is forbidden to count Israel even for the purpose of fulfilling a commandment, as  can be read, "And he numbered them with pebbles (be-bezek)." Rav Ashi demurred, asking how Rabbi Isaac knew that the word , bezek, in  means being broken pieces (that is, pebbles). Rabbi Eleazar taught that whoever counts Israel transgresses a Biblical prohibition, as  says, "Yet the number of the children of Israel shall be as the sand of the sea, which cannot be measured." Rav Naḥman bar Isaac said that such a person would transgress two prohibitions, for  says, "Which cannot be measured nor numbered." Rabbi Samuel bar Naḥmani reported that Rabbi Jonathan noted a potential contradiction, as  says, "Yet the number of the children of Israel shall be as the sand of the sea" (implying a finite number), but  also says, "Which cannot be numbered" (implying that they will not have a finite number). The Gemara answered that there is no contradiction, for the latter part of  speaks of the time when Israel fulfils God's will, while the earlier part of  speaks of the time when they do not fulfill God's will. Rabbi (Judah the Prince) said on behalf of Abba Jose ben Dosthai that there is no contradiction, for the latter part of  speaks of counting done by human beings, while the earlier part of  speaks of counting by Heaven.

The Rabbis taught in a Baraita that upon entering a barn to measure the new grain one should recite the blessing, "May it be Your will O Lord, our God, that You may send blessing upon the work of our hands." Once one has begun to measure, one should say, "Blessed be the One who sends blessing into this heap." If, however, one first measured the grain and then recited the blessing, then prayer is in vain, because blessing is not to be found in anything that has been already weighed or measured or numbered, but only in a thing hidden from sight.

Similarly, reading , “And Isaac sowed in that land, and found in that year a hundredfold (she'arim),” a Midrash taught that the words, “a hundred , she'arim” indicate that they estimated it, but it produced a hundred times the estimate, for blessing does not rest upon that which is weighed, measured, or counted. They measured solely on account of the tithes.

The Gemara taught that taking a census required atonement. Rabbi Eleazar taught that God told David that David called God an inciter, but God would make David stumble over a thing that even school-children knew, namely, that which  says, "When you take the sum of the children of Israel according to their number, then shall they give every man a ransom for his soul into the Lord . . . that there be no plague among them." Forthwith, as  reports, "Satan stood up against Israel," and as  reports, "He stirred up David against them saying, ‘Go, number Israel.'" And when David did number them, he took no ransom from them, and as  reports, "So the Lord sent a pestilence upon Israel from the morning even to the time appointed." The Gemara asked what  meant by "the time appointed." Samuel the elder, the son-in-law of Rabbi Hanina, answered in the name of Rabbi Hanina: From the time of slaughtering the continual offering (at dawn) until the time of sprinkling the blood. Rabbi Joḥanan said it meant at midday. So Abishai son of Zeruiah then died, and he was individually equal in worth to the greater part of the Sanhedrin. Reading , "And as he was about to destroy, the Lord beheld, and He repented," the Gemara ask what God beheld. Rav said God beheld Jacob, as  reports, "And Jacob said when he beheld them." Samuel said that God beheld the ashes of the ram of Isaac, as  says, "God will see for Himself the lamb." Rabbi Isaac Nappaha taught that God saw the atonement money that  reports God required Moses to collect. Alternatively, Rabbi Joḥanan taught that God saw the Temple. For  explained the meaning of the name that Abraham gave to the mountain where Abraham nearly sacrificed Isaac to be, "In the mount where the Lord is seen." (Solomon later built the Temple on that mountain, and God saw the merit of the sacrifices there.) Rabbi Jacob bar Iddi and Rabbi Samuel bar Naḥmani differed on the matter. One said that God saw the atonement money that  reports God required Moses to collect from the Israelites, while the other said that God saw the Temple. The Gemara concluded that the more likely view was that God saw the Temple, as  can be read to say, "As it will be said on that day, ‘in the mount where the Lord is seen.'"

A Midrash read , “Raise the head of the children of Israel,” to teach that God bestows preferment just as a king of flesh and blood bestows preferment.

The king had, however, one particular granary that he perceived to be a fine one. The king thus told a member of his household not to be particular about the quantity of the granaries full of refuse and rye-grass. But as to the fine granary, however, the king directed the member of his household to ascertain the quantity of its contents with particularity. Thus, God was like the king, Israel was like the fine granary, and the member of the king's house was Moses. Thus God instructed Moses to be particular numbering the Israelites, and Moses did so, as  reports that God told Moses, “Take the sum of all the congregation of the children of Israel,”  reports, “And his host, and those who were numbered of them,” and  reports that God told Moses, “Number all the firstborn males.”

The Gemara deduced from the words "by their families, by their fathers' houses" in  that the Torah identifies families by the father's line.

Rabbi Simeon bar Abba in the name of Rabbi Joḥanan taught that every time Scripture uses the expression “and it was” (vayechi), it intimates the coming of either trouble or joy. If it intimates trouble, there was no trouble to compare with it, and if it itimatres joy, there was no joy to compare with it. Rabbi Samuel bar Naḥman made a distinction: In every instance where Scripture employs “and it was” (vayechi), it introduces trouble, while when Scripture employs “and it shall be” (vehayah), it introduces joy. The Sages raised an objection to Rabbi Samuel's view, noting that to introduce the offerings of the princes,  says, “And he that presented his offering . . . was (vayechi),” and surely that was a positive thing. Rabbi Samuel replied that the occasion of the princes’ gifts did not indicate joy, because it was manifest to God that the princes would join with Korah in his dispute (as reported in ). Rabbi Judah ben Rabbi Simon said in the name of Rabbi Levi ben Parta that the case could be compared to that of a member of the palace who committed a theft in the bathhouse, and the attendant, while afraid of disclosing his name, nevertheless made him known by describing him as a certain young man dressed in white. Similarly, although  does not explicitly mention the names of the princes who sided with Korah in his dispute,  nevertheless refers to them when it says, “They were princes of the congregation, the elect men of the assembly, men of renown,” and this recalls , “These were the elect of the congregation, the princes of the tribes of their fathers . . . ,” where the text lists their names. They were the “men of renown” whose names were mentioned in connection with the standards; as  says, “These are the names of the men who shall stand with you, of Reuben, Elizur the son of Shedeur; of Simeon, Shelumiel the son of Zurishaddai . . . .”

Rabbi Judah ben Shalom taught that  excluded the Levites from being numbered with the rest of the Israelites for their own benefit, for as  reports, "all that were numbered" died in the wilderness, but because the Levites were numbered separately, they entered the land of Israel. A Midrash offered another explanation for why the Levites were not numbered with the Israelites: The Levites were the palace-guard and it would not have been consonant with the dignity of a king that his own legion should be numbered with the other legions.

The Rabbis taught in a Baraita that when the Israelites wandered in the wilderness, the Levitical camp established in  served as the place of refuge to which manslayers could flee.

A non-Jew asked Shammai to convert him to Judaism on condition that Shammai appoint him High Priest. Shammai pushed him away with a builder's ruler. The non-Jew then went to Hillel, who converted him. Hillel answered that it applied even to David, King of Israel, who had not been a priest. Thereupon the convert reasoned a fortiori that if the injunction applied to all (non-priestly) Israelites, whom in  God had called "my firstborn," how much more so would the injunction apply to a mere convert, who came among the Israelites with just his staff and bag. Then the convert returned to Shammai, quoted the injunction, and remarked on how absurd it had been for him to ask Shammai to appoint him High Priest.

The Gemara relates that once Rabban Gamaliel, Rabbi Eleazar ben Azariah, Rabbi Joshua, and Rabbi Akiva went to Jerusalem after the destruction of the Temple, and just as they came to Mount Scopus, they saw a fox emerging from the Holy of Holies. The first three Rabbis began to cry, but Akiva smiled. The three asked him why he smiled, but Akiva asked them why they wept. Quoting , they told him that they wept because a place of which it was once said, "And the common man that draws near shall be put to death," had become the haunt of foxes. Akiva replied that he smiled because this fulfilled the prophecy of Uriah the priest, who prophesied (along with Micah, as reported in ) that "Zion shall be plowed as a field, and Jerusalem shall become heaps, and the mountain of the House as the high places of a forest." And  linked Uriah's prophecy with Zechariah's. And  prophesied that "[t]here shall yet old men and old women sit in the broad places of Jerusalem." So the fulfillment of Uriah's prophecy gave Akiva certainty that Zechariah's hopeful prophecy would also find fulfillment. The others then told Akiva that he had comforted them.

Numbers chapter 2

Rabbi Eliezer in the name of Rabbi Jose ben Zimra taught that whenever the Israelites were numbered for a proper purpose, they lost no numbers; but whenever they were numbered without a proper purpose, they suffered a diminution. Rabbi Eliezer taught that they were numbered for a proper purpose in connection with the standards (as reported in ) and the division of the land, but were numbered without a proper purpose (as reported in ) in the days of David.

And another Midrash cited the words "his standard over me is love" in Song of Songs  to teach that it was with a sign of great love that God organized the Israelites under standards like the ministering angels.

A Midrash told that the Israelites camped around the Ark in the four cardinal directions just as God set four angels around God's throne — Michael, Gabriel, Uriel, and Raphael. Michael, at God's right, corresponded to Reuben. Uriel, at God's left, corresponded to Dan, who was on the north side. Gabriel, in front, corresponded to the kingship of Judah and to Moses and Aaron, who were on the east side. And Raphael corresponded to Ephraim who was on the west.

The Midrash thus taught that the saying, "Woe to the wicked and woe to his neighbor!" applies to Dathan and Abiram.  reports that the descendants of Kohath, among whom Korah was numbered, lived on the south side of the Tabernacle. And  reports that the descendants of Reuben, among whom Dathan and Abiram were numbered, lived close by, as they also lived on the south side of the Tabernacle.

Rabbi Hama bar Haninah and Rabbi Josiah disagreed about what configuration the Israelites traveled in when they traveled in the Wilderness. Refuting the other's argument, the one who said that they traveled in the shape of a beam read , "as they encamp, so shall they set forward," to teach that just as the configuration of their camp was according to God's Word, so the configuration of their journey was by God's Word. While the one who said that they traveled in the shape of a box read , "the camp of the children of Dan, which was the rearward of all the camps," to teach that Dan was more populous than the other camps, and would thus travel in the rear, and if anyone would lose any item, the camp of Dan would return it.

As a consequence, offerings of lesser sanctity could be consumed wherever the Israelite camp was located.

Rav Aha bar Jacob taught that a tribe that had an inheritance of land was called a "congregation," but a tribe that had no possession was not a "congregation." Thus Rav Aha bar Jacob taught that the tribe of Levi was not called a "congregation." The Gemara questioned Rav Aha's teaching, asking whether there would then be fewer than 12 tribes. Abaye replied quoting Jacob's words in  "Ephraim and Manasseh, even as Reuben and Simeon, shall be mine." The Gemara challenged Rava's interpretation, noting that  mentions Ephraim and Manasseh separately as tribes in connection with their assembling around the camp by their banners. The Gemara replied to its own challenge by positing that their campings were like their possessions, in order to show respect to their banners. The Gemara persisted in arguing that Ephraim and Manasseh were treated separately by noting that they were also separated with regard to their princes. The Gemara responded that this was done in order to show honor to the princes and to avoid having to choose the prince of one tribe to rule over the other. 1 Kings  indicates that Solomon celebrated seven days of dedication of the Temple in Jerusalem, and Moses celebrated twelve days of dedication of the Tabernacle instead of seven in order to show honor to the princes and to avoid having to choose the prince of one tribe over the other.

The Mishnah reports that Abba Saul argued that just as  uses the word , alav, to mean "next to it," to describe the location of the tribe of Manasseh, so too when  uses the term , al, to describe the location of the frankincense, it should also mean "next to." But the Rabbis disagreed.

A Midrash noted that  says, "Thus did the Children of Israel: according to all that the Lord commanded Moses," but does not mention Aaron (whereas  reports that "The Lord spoke to Moses and Aaron").

Numbers chapter 3
Rabbi Samuel bar Naḥmani taught in Rabbi Jonathan's name that  referred to Aaron's sons as descendants of Aaron and Moses because Moses taught them, showing that Scripture ascribes merit to one who teaches Torah to a neighbor's child as if the teacher had begotten the child.

A Midrash noted that Scripture records the death of Nadab and Abihu in numerous places, including . This teaches that God grieved for Nadab and Abihu, for they were dear to God. And thus  quotes God to say: "Through them who are near to Me I will be sanctified."

The Mishnah taught that before the Tabernacle was constructed, the firstborns performed services. After the Tabernacle was constructed, the priests performed the services.

The Mishnah taught that as the Levites exempted the Israelites' firstborn in the wilderness, it followed a fortiori that they should exempt their own animals from the requirement to offer the firstborn. The Gemara questioned whether  taught that the Levites' animals exempted the Israelites' animals. Abaye read the Mishnah to mean that if the Levites' animals released the Israelites' animals, it followed a fortiori that the Levites' animals should release their own firstborn. But Rava countered that the Mishnah meant that the Levites themselves exempted the Israelites' firstborn.

The Rabbis taught that  directed counting the Levites "from a month old and upward" and not earlier because they considered a newborn infant not to be definitely viable, but a child who had lived a month was definitely known to be viable.

A Midrash taught that the Levites camped on the four sides of the Tabernacle in accordance with their duties. The Midrash explained that from the west came snow, hail, cold, and heat, and thus God placed the Gershonites on the west, as  indicates that their service was "the tent, the covering thereof, and the screen for the door of the tent of meeting," which could shield against snow, hail, cold, and heat. The Midrash explained that from the north came darkness, and thus the Merarites camped there, as  indicates that their service was the carrying of wood ("the boards of the tabernacle, and the bars thereof, and the pillars thereof, and the sockets thereof") which  teaches counteract idolatrous influences when it says, "The chastisement of vanities is wood." And the Midrash explained that from the east comes light, and thus Moses, Aaron, and his sons camped there, because they were scholars and men of pious deeds, bringing atonement by their prayer and sacrifices.

A Midrash taught that Korah took issue with Moses in  because Moses had (as  reports) appointed Elizaphan the son of Uzziel as prince of the Kohathites, and Korah was (as  reports) son of Uzziel's older brother Izhar, and thus had a claim to leadership prior to Elizaphan.

Abaye reported a tradition that a singing Levite who did his colleague's work at the gate incurred the death penalty, as  says, “And those who were to pitch before the Tabernacle eastward before the Tent of Meeting toward the sun-rising, were Moses and Aaron, . . . and the stranger who drew near was to be put to death.” Abaye argued that the “stranger” in  could not mean a non-priest, for  had mentioned that rule already (and Abaye believed that the Torah would not state anything twice). Rather, reasoned Abaye,  must mean a “stranger” to a particular job. It was told, however, that Rabbi Joshua ben Hananyia once tried to assist Rabbi Joḥanan ben Gudgeda (both of whom were Levites) in the fastening of the Temple doors, even though Rabbi Joshua was a singer, not a door-keeper. Rabbi Jonathan found evidence for the Levites’ singing role at Temple services from the warning of  “That they [the Levites] do not die, neither they, nor you [Aaron, the priest].” Just as  warned about priestly duties at the altar, so (Rabbi Jonathan reasoned)  must also address the Levites’ duties in the altar service.

Numbers chapter 4
The Midrash taught that Scripture gives Kohath precedence over Gershon because the Kohathites bore the ark that carried the Torah. Similarly, another Midrash taught that God ordered the Kohathites counted first because Kohath was most holy, for Aaron the priest — who was most holy — descended from Kohath, while Gershon was only holy. And  says "they also" with regard to the Gershonites so that one should not suppose that the Gershonites were numbered second because they were inferior to the Kohathites; rather  says "they also" to indicate that the Gershonites were also like the Kohathites in every respect, and the Kohathites were placed first in this connection as a mark of respect to the Torah.

A Midrash noted that in  "the Lord spoke to Moses and Aaron" to direct them to count the Kohathites and in  "the Lord spoke to Moses" to direct him to count the Gershonites, but  does not report that "the Lord spoke" to direct them to count the Merarites. The Midrash deduced that  employed the words "the Lord spoke" so as to give honor to Gershon as the firstborn, and to give him the same status as Kohath. The Midrash then noted that  reported that God spoke "to Aaron" with regard to the Kohathites but  did not report communication to Aaron with regard to the Gershonites. The Midrash taught that God excluded Aaron from all Divine communications to Moses and that passages that mention Aaron do not report that God spoke to Aaron, but include Aaron's name in sections that concern Aaron to indicate that God spoke to Moses so that he might repeat what he heard to Aaron. Thus  mentions Aaron regarding the Kohathites because Aaron and his sons assigned the Kohathites their duties, since (as  relates) the Kohathites were not permitted to touch the ark or any of the vessels until Aaron and his sons had covered them. In the case of the Gershonites, however, the Midrash finds no evidence that Aaron personally interfered with them, as Ithamar supervised their tasks, and thus  does not mention Aaron in connection with the Gershonites.

The Midrash deduced that God honored the Kohathites on account of the honor of the ark and the Gershonites because Gershon was a firstborn. But since the Merarites neither cared for the ark nor descended from a firstborn, God did not use the expression "lift up the head."

A Midrash noted that , 23, 30, 35, 39, 43, and 47 say that Levites "30 years old and upward" did service in the tent of meeting, while  says, "from 25 years old and upward they shall go in to perform the service in the work of the tent of meeting." The Midrash deduced that the difference teaches that all those five years, from the age of 25 to the age of 30, Levites served apprenticeships, and from that time onward they were allowed to draw near to do service. The Midrash concluded that a Levite could not enter the Temple courtyard to do service unless he had served an apprenticeship of five years. And the Midrash inferred from this that students who see no sign of success in their studies within a period of five years will never see any.

A Midrash taught that  provides that they "spread a cloth of pure blue on top" of the Ark because blue is like the sea, the sea is like the sky, and the sky is like the Throne of Glory, as  says, "Above the expanse over their heads was the semblance of a throne, in appearance like sapphire." Thus, the Midrash concluded that the Ark was like the Throne of Glory, and  uses the expression "all of blue" to indicate that the Ark was in every way like the Throne of Glory. And because the Ark was like the Throne of Glory, they placed the cloth of blue on top, facing towards the sky that resembled it. The Midrash noted that no other vessel had a cloth of blue on top. The Midrash taught that  uses the expression "all of blue" only in connection with the Ark, and not with regard to any other vessel, because the Ark was more important than all the other vessels of the Tabernacle.

The Gemara there noted that  spoke of what the Kohathites should avoid doing so "that they may live, and not die." And  enjoined that "they shall not go in to see the holy things as they are being covered, lest they die." And since  indicates that the Kohathites ceased working near the holy things at age 50, these deaths of karet would have to have occurred before the age of 50. The Babylonian Talmud reports that Rabbah said that deaths between the ages of 50 and 60 are also deaths by karet.

Reading , “Cut not off the tribe of the families of the Kohathites from among the Levites,” Rabbi Abba bar Aibu noted that it would have been enough for the text to mention the family of Kohath, and asked why  also mentions the whole tribe. Rabbi Abba bar Aibu explained that God (in the words of ), “declar[es] the end from the beginning,” and provides beforehand for things that have not yet occurred. God foresaw that Korah, who would descend from the families of Kohath, would oppose Moses (as reported in ) and that Moses would beseech God that the earth should swallow them up (as reflected in ). So God told Moses to note that it was (in the words of ) “to be a memorial to the children of Israel, to the end that no common man . . . draw near to burn incense . . . as the Lord spoke to him by the hand of Moses.” The Midrash asked why then  adds the potentially superfluous words “to him,” and replied that it is to teach that God told Moses that God would listen to his prayer concerning Korah but not concerning the whole tribe. Therefore  says, “Cut not off the tribe of the families of the Kohathites from among the Levites.”

In medieval Jewish interpretation
The parashah is discussed in these medieval Jewish sources:

Numbers chapter 1
Reading  “The Lord spoke . . . in the Sinai Desert . . . on the first of the month . . . ‘Take a census,’” Rashi taught that God counted the Israelites often because they were dear to God. On the first of Nisan, the Tabernacle was erected, and on the first of Iyar, God counted them.

The Zohar taught that in no other counting of Israel were they blessed as in this one, for God intended this counting for blessing — a counting to consummate completeness of the worlds.

Numbers chapter 3
 refers to duties of the Levites. Maimonides and the siddur report that the Levites would recite the Psalm for the Day in the Temple.

Maimonides taught that it is a positive commandment for every Jewish man to redeem his son who is the firstborn of a Jewish mother, as  says, "All first issues of the womb are mine," and  says, "And you shall surely redeem a firstborn man." Maimonides taught that a mother is not obligated to redeem her son. If a father fails to redeem his son, when the son comes of age, he is obligated to redeem himself. If it is necessary for a man to redeem both himself and his son, he should redeem himself first and then his son. If he only has enough money for one redemption, he should redeem himself. A person who redeems his son recites the blessing: "Blessed are You . . . who sanctified us with His commandments and commanded us concerning the redemption of a son." Afterwards, he recites the shehecheyanu blessing and then gives the redemption money to the Cohen. If a man redeems himself, he should recite the blessing: "Blessed . . . who commanded us to redeem the firstborn" and he should recite the shehecheyanu blessing. The father may pay the redemption in silver or in movable property that has financial worth like that of silver coins. If the Cohen desires to return the redemption to the father, he may. The father should not, however, give it to the Cohen with the intent that he return it. The father must give it to the Cohen with the resolution that he is giving him a present without any reservations. Cohens and Levites are exempt from the redemption of their firstborn, as they served as the redemption of the Israelites' firstborn in the desert. A baby born by Caesarian section and any subsequent birth are exempt: the first because it did not emerge from the womb, and the second, because it was preceded by another birth. The obligation for redemption takes effect when the baby completes 30 days of life, as  says, "And those to be redeemed should be redeemed from the age of a month."

In modern interpretation
Modern scholarly interpretations of material in the parsha include:

Numbers chapter 3
Kugel reported that scholars note that P spoke about "the priests, Aaron's sons," because, as far as P was concerned, the only legitimate priests descended from Aaron. P did speak of the Levites as another group of hereditary Temple officials, but according to P, the Levites had a different status: They could not offer sacrifices or perform the other crucial jobs assigned to priests, but served Aaron's descendants as helpers. D, on the other hand, never talked about Aaron's descendants as special, but referred to "the Levitical priests." Kugel reported that many modern scholars interpreted this to mean that D believed that any Levite was a proper priest and could offer sacrifices and perform other priestly tasks, and this may have been the case for some time in Israel. And placing incense and whole burnt offerings before God were the quintessential priestly functions. Kugel reported that many scholars believe that  dated to a far earlier era, and thus may thus may indicate that all Levites had been considered fit priests at a very early time.

Milgrom surmised that this may reflect an ancient rule where the firstborn was expected to care for the burial and worship of his deceased parents. Milgrom dismissed as without support the theory that the firstborn was originally offered as a sacrifice.

 reports that a shekel equals 20 gerahs. This table translates units of weight used in the Bible:

Commandments
According to Maimonides and Sefer ha-Chinuch, there are no commandments in the parashah.

The Weekly Maqam

In the Weekly Maqam, Sephardi Jews each week base the songs of the services on the content of that week's parashah. For Parashat Bemidbar, Sephardi Jews apply Maqam Rast, the maqam that shows a beginning or an initiation of something, because the parashah initiates the Book of Numbers. In the common case where this parashah precedes the holiday of Shavuot, then the maqam that is applied is Hoseni, the maqam that symbolizes the beauty of receiving the Torah.

Haftarah

Connection between the haftarah and the parashah
Both the parashah and the haftarah recount Israel's numbers, the parashah in the census, and the haftarah in reference to numbers "like that of the sands of the sea." Both the parashah and the haftarah place Israel in the wilderness (midbar).

The haftarah in the liturgy
Observant Jews recite the concluding lines of the haftarah, when they put on tefillin in the morning. They wrap the tefillin strap around their fingers as a groom puts a wedding ring on his betrothed, symbolizing the marriage of God and Israel.

On Shabbat Machar Chodesh

Notes

Further reading
The parashah has parallels or is discussed in these sources:

Ancient
Shu-ilishu. Ur, 20th Century BCE. In, e.g., Douglas Frayne. "Shu-ilishu." In The Context of Scripture, Volume II: Monumental Inscriptions from the Biblical World. Edited by William W. Hallo. New York: Brill, 2000. . (standards).

Biblical
 (Nahshon son of Amminadab);  (firstborn);  (firstborn);  (firstborn);  (shekel of atonement).
 (firstborn); 26:1–65 (census).
 (firstborn);  (Reuben's numbers).
.
 (in the wilderness);  (firstborn).
 (on four sides).
 (wilderness).
 (Manasseh, Ephraim, Judah);  (Ephriam, Judah);  (Benjamin, Judah, Zebulun, Naphtali);  (Ephraim, Benjamin, Manasseh);  (obeying commandments);  (incense);  (able to go to war).

. (Nahshon son of Amminadab).
 (census);  (enumerating the leaders of Israel).

Early nonrabbinic
Philo. Who Is the Heir of Divine Things? 24:124. Alexandria, Egypt, early 1st Century CE. In, e.g., The Works of Philo: Complete and Unabridged, New Updated Edition. Translated by Charles Duke Yonge, page 286. Peabody, Massachusetts: Hendrickson Publishers, 1993. .
Josephus, Antiquities of the Jews 3:12:4. Circa 93–94. In, e.g., The Works of Josephus: Complete and Unabridged, New Updated Edition. Translated by William Whiston, page 98. Peabody, Massachusetts: Hendrickson Publishers, 1987. .

Classical rabbinic
Mishnah: Sanhedrin 9:6; Zevachim 14:4; Menachot 11:5; Bekhorot 1:1–9:8. Land of Israel, circa 200 CE. In, e.g., The Mishnah: A New Translation. Translated by Jacob Neusner, pages 604, 731, 757, 788, 790. New Haven: Yale University Press, 1988. .
Tosefta: Megillah 3:22; Sotah 7:17, 11:20; Bekhorot 1:1. Land of Israel, circa 300 CE. In, e.g., The Tosefta: Translated from the Hebrew, with a New Introduction. Translated by Jacob Neusner, volume 1, pages 538, 650, 864, 882; volume 2, pages 1469–94. Peabody, Massachusetts: Hendrickson Publishers, 2002. .
Jerusalem Talmud: Bikkurim 11b; Shabbat 76b; Eruvin 35b; Yoma 31a; Megillah 15b, 17b; Yevamot 12a; Sanhedrin 11b, 60b. Tiberias, Land of Israel, circa 400 CE. In, e.g., Talmud Yerushalmi. Edited by Chaim Malinowitz, Yisroel Simcha Schorr, and Mordechai Marcus, volumes 12, 15, 17, 21, 26, 29, 44–45, _. Brooklyn: Mesorah Publications, 2007–2018. And in, e.g., The Jerusalem Talmud: A Translation and Commentary. Edited by Jacob Neusner and translated by Jacob Neusner, Tzvee Zahavy, B. Barry Levy, and Edward Goldman. Peabody, Massachusetts: Hendrickson Publishers, 2009. .
Mekhilta of Rabbi Ishmael Pisha 3, 5; Amalek 4; Bahodesh 1. Land of Israel, late 4th Century. In, e.g., Mekhilta According to Rabbi Ishmael. Translated by Jacob Neusner, volume 1, pages 22, 30; volume 2, pages 36, 41. Atlanta: Scholars Press, 1988. . And Mekhilta de-Rabbi Ishmael. Translated by Jacob Z. Lauterbach, volume 1, pages 18, 25; volume 2, pages 289–90. Philadelphia: Jewish Publication Society, 1933, reissued 2004. .
Mekhilta of Rabbi Simeon 16:1; 19:2; 47:2; 48:1; 57:1, 3; 76:4; 83:1. Land of Israel, 5th Century. In, e.g., Mekhilta de-Rabbi Shimon bar Yohai. Translated by W. David Nelson, pages 54, 75, 211–12, 255, 258, 355, 375. Philadelphia: Jewish Publication Society, 2006. .
Genesis Rabbah 7:2; 53:13; 55:6; 64:6, 8; 94:9; 97 (NV); 97 (MSV); 97:5. Land of Israel, 5th Century. In, e.g., Midrash Rabbah: Genesis. Translated by Harry Freedman and Maurice Simon, volume 1, pages 50, 472, 486; volume 2, pages 578, 876, 898, 934, 942. London: Soncino Press, 1939. .
Leviticus Rabbah. Land of Israel, 5th century. In, e.g., Midrash Rabbah: Leviticus. Translated by Harry Freedman and Maurice Simon, volume 4, pages 16, 21, 232–33, 260, 262, 411, 415, 420–21, 457. London: Soncino Press, 1939. .

Babylonian Talmud: Berakhot 62b; Shabbat 31a, 92a, 116a; Pesachim 6b; Yoma 54a, 58a; Moed Katan 28a; Chagigah 25a; Yevamot 64a; Nedarim 55a; Nazir 45a, 49a; Kiddushin 69a; Bava Batra 109b, 121b; Sanhedrin 16b–17a, 19b, 36b, 81b, 82b; Makkot 12b, 15a, 24b; Shevuot 15a; Horayot 6b; Zevachim 55a, 61b, 116b, 119b; Menachot 28b, 37b, 95a, 96a; Chullin 69b; Bekhorot 2a, 3b–5a, 13a, 47a, 49a, 51a; Arakhin 11b, 18b; Tamid 26a. Sasanian Empire, 6th Century. In, e.g., Talmud Bavli. Edited by Yisroel Simcha Schorr, Chaim Malinowitz, and Mordechai Marcus, 72 volumes. Brooklyn: Mesorah Pubs., 2006.
Pesikta de-Rav Kahana 2:8, 4:3, 7:5, 26:9–10. 6th–7th Century. In, e.g., Pesikta de-Rab Kahana: R. Kahana's Compilation of Discourses for Sabbaths and Festal Days. Translated by William G. Braude and Israel J. Kapstein, 33, 70, 144, 404–06. Philadelphia: Jewish Publication Society, 1975. . And Pesiqta deRab Kahana: An Analytical Translation and Explanation. Translated by Jacob Neusner, volume 1, pages 27, 56, 116; volume 2, pages 136–37. Atlanta: Scholars Press, 1987.  & .
Midrash Tanḥuma Bamidbar. Circa 775–900 CE. In, e.g., The Metsudah Midrash Tanchuma: Bamidbar 1. Translated and annotated by Avrohom Davis, edited by Yaakov Y.H. Pupko, volume 6, pages 1–88. Monsey, New York: Eastern Book Press, 2006.

Medieval
Saadia Gaon. The Book of Beliefs and Opinions, 2:10, 12. Baghdad, 933. Translated by Samuel Rosenblatt, pages 118, 128. New Haven: Yale University Press, 1948. .

Rashi. Commentary. Numbers 1–4. Troyes, France, late 11th Century. In, e.g., Rashi. The Torah: With Rashi's Commentary Translated, Annotated, and Elucidated. Translated and annotated by Yisrael Isser Zvi Herczeg, volume 4, pages 1–33. Brooklyn: Mesorah Publications, 1997. .
Rashbam. Commentary on the Torah. Troyes, early 12th century. In, e.g., Rashbam's Commentary on Leviticus and Numbers: An Annotated Translation. Edited and translated by Martin I. Lockshin, pages 155–65. Providence: Brown Judaic Studies, 2001. .
Judah Halevi. Kuzari. part 2, ¶ 26. Toledo, Spain, 1130–1140. In, e.g., Jehuda Halevi. Kuzari: An Argument for the Faith of Israel. Introduction by Henry Slonimsky, page 105. New York: Schocken, 1964. .
Numbers Rabbah 1:1–5:9; 6:2–3, 5–7, 11; 7:2–3; 9:14; 10:1; 12:15–16; 13:5; 14:3–4, 14, 19; 15:17; 18:2–3, 5; 19:3; 21:7. 12th Century. In, e.g., Judah J. Slotki, translator. Midrash Rabbah: Numbers, volume 5, pages 1–156, 160, 162, 166, 168–71, 177, 180–82, 268–69, 335; volume 6, pages 486, 489, 515, 573, 584, 627, 633, 662, 708, 710–11, 714, 753, 834. London: Soncino Press, 1939. .
Abraham ibn Ezra. Commentary on the Torah. Mid-12th century. In, e.g., Ibn Ezra's Commentary on the Pentateuch: Numbers (Ba-Midbar). Translated and annotated by H. Norman Strickman and Arthur M. Silver, pages 1–31. New York: Menorah Publishing Company, 1999. .

Maimonides. Guide for the Perplexed, part 3, chapter 24. Cairo, Egypt, 1190. In, e.g., Moses Maimonides. The Guide for the Perplexed. Translated by Michael Friedländer, page 305. New York: Dover Publications, 1956. . (wilderness).
Hezekiah ben Manoah. Hizkuni. France, circa 1240. In, e.g., Chizkiyahu ben Manoach. Chizkuni: Torah Commentary. Translated and annotated by Eliyahu Munk, volume 3, pages 847–59. Jerusalem: Ktav Publishers, 2013. .
Naḥmanides. Commentary on the Torah. Jerusalem, circa 1270. In, e.g., Ramban (Nachmanides): Commentary on the Torah: Numbers. Translated by Charles B. Chavel, volume 4, pages 5–36. New York: Shilo Publishing House, 1975. .
Zohar part 1, pages 130a, 200a; part 2, page 85a; part 3, pages 57a, 117a–121a, 177b. Spain, late 13th Century. In, e.g., The Zohar. Translated by Harry Sperling and Maurice Simon. 5 volumes. London: Soncino Press, 1934. And in, e.g., The Zohar: Pritzker Edition. Translation and commentary by Daniel C. Matt, volume 8, pages 250–84. Stanford, California: Stanford University Press, 2014.
Jacob ben Asher (Baal Ha-Turim). Rimze Ba'al ha-Turim. Early 14th century. In, e.g., Baal Haturim Chumash: Bamidbar/Numbers. Translated by Eliyahu Touger, edited and annotated by Avie Gold, volume 4, pages 1349–87. Brooklyn: Mesorah Publications, 2003. . 
Jacob ben Asher. Perush Al ha-Torah. Early 14th century. In, e.g., Yaakov ben Asher. Tur on the Torah. Translated and annotated by Eliyahu Munk, volume 3, pages 1004–24. Jerusalem: Lambda Publishers, 2005. .
Isaac ben Moses Arama. Akedat Yizhak (The Binding of Isaac). Late 15th century. In, e.g., Yitzchak Arama. Akeydat Yitzchak: Commentary of Rabbi Yitzchak Arama on the Torah. Translated and condensed by Eliyahu Munk, volume 2, pages 683–91. New York, Lambda Publishers, 2001. .

Modern
Isaac Abravanel. Commentary on the Torah. Italy, between 1492 and 1509. In, e.g., Abarbanel: Selected Commentaries on the Torah: Volume 4: Bamidbar/Numbers. Translated and annotated by Israel Lazar, pages 15–44. Brooklyn: CreateSpace, 2015. .
Obadiah ben Jacob Sforno. Commentary on the Torah. Venice, 1567. In, e.g., Sforno: Commentary on the Torah. Translation and explanatory notes by Raphael Pelcovitz, pages 639–59. Brooklyn: Mesorah Publications, 1997. .
Moshe Alshich. Commentary on the Torah. Safed, circa 1593. In, e.g., Moshe Alshich. Midrash of Rabbi Moshe Alshich on the Torah. Translated and annotated by Eliyahu Munk, volume 3, pages 791–801. New York, Lambda Publishers, 2000. .
Shabbethai Bass. Sifsei Chachamim. Amsterdam, 1680. In, e.g., Sefer Bamidbar: From the Five Books of the Torah: Chumash: Targum Okelos: Rashi: Sifsei Chachamim: Yalkut: Haftaros, translated by Avrohom Y. Davis, pages 1–53. Lakewood Township, New Jersey: Metsudah Publications, 2013.
Chaim ibn Attar. Ohr ha-Chaim. Venice, 1742. In Chayim ben Attar. Or Hachayim: Commentary on the Torah. Translated by Eliyahu Munk, volume 4, pages 1347–58. Brooklyn: Lambda Publishers, 1999. .
Yitzchak Magriso. Me'am Lo'ez. Constantinople, 1764. In Yitzchak Magriso. The Torah Anthology: MeAm Lo'ez. Translated by Tzvi Faier, edited with notes by Aryeh Kaplan, volume 13, pages 1–73. Jerusalem: Moznaim Publishing, 1990.

Samuel David Luzzatto (Shadal). Commentary on the Torah. Padua, 1871. In, e.g., Samuel David Luzzatto. Torah Commentary. Translated and annotated by Eliyahu Munk, volume 3, pages 1004–17. New York: Lambda Publishers, 2012. .
Yehudah Aryeh Leib Alter. Sefat Emet. Góra Kalwaria (Ger), Poland, before 1906. Excerpted in The Language of Truth: The Torah Commentary of Sefat Emet. Translated and interpreted by Arthur Green, pages 219–23. Philadelphia: Jewish Publication Society, 1998. . Reprinted 2012. .
Louis Ginzberg. Legends of the Jews, volume 3, pages 219–38. Philadelphia: Jewish Publication Society, 1911.
Alexander Alan Steinbach. Sabbath Queen: Fifty-four Bible Talks to the Young Based on Each Portion of the Pentateuch, pages 107–10. New York: Behrman's Jewish Book House, 1936.
Julius H. Greenstone. Numbers: With Commentary: The Holy Scriptures, pages 1–33. Philadelphia: Jewish Publication Society, 1939. Reprinted by Literary Licensing, 2011. .

Robert F. Kennedy. Remarks at the University of Kansas, March 18, 1968. In Maxwell Taylor Kennedy. Make Gentle the Life of This World: The Vision of Robert F. Kennedy, page 21. Broadway, 1998. . (Can you judge a people by its numbers?)
Ivan Caine. “Numbers in the Joseph Narrative.” In Jewish Civilization: Essays and Studies: Volume 1. Edited by Ronald A. Brauner, page 3. Philadelphia: Reconstructionist Rabbinical College, 1979. ISSN 0191-3034..
Elie Munk. The Call of the Torah: An Anthology of Interpretation and Commentary on the Five Books of Moses. Translated by E.S. Mazer, volume 4, pages 2–33. Brooklyn: Mesorah Publications, 1993. Originally published as La Voix de la Thora. Paris: Fondation Samuel et Odette Levy, 1981.
Philip J. Budd. Word Biblical Commentary: Volume 5: Numbers, pages 1–52. Waco, Texas: Word Books, 1984. .
Pinchas H. Peli. Torah Today: A Renewed Encounter with Scripture, pages 157–60. Washington, D.C.: B'nai B'rith Books, 1987. .
Jacob Milgrom. The JPS Torah Commentary: Numbers: The Traditional Hebrew Text with the New JPS Translation, pages 3–29, 335–44. Philadelphia: Jewish Publication Society, 1990. .
Mark S. Smith. The Early History of God: Yahweh and the Other Deities in Ancient Israel, pages 2, 10. New York: HarperSanFrancisco, 1990. . (36).
Baruch Levine. Numbers 1–20, volume 4, pages 125–78. New York: Anchor Bible, 1993. .
Mary Douglas. In the Wilderness: The Doctrine of Defilement in the Book of Numbers, pages xviii, 97, 99–100, 103, 109–10, 120, 123, 127–31, 133, 137–38, 174, 179–80, 207, 246. Oxford: Oxford University Press, 1993. .
Gerald Skolnik. "Should There Be a Special Ceremony in Recognition of a First-Born Female Child?" New York: Rabbinical Assembly, 1993. YD 305:1.1993. In Responsa: 1991–2000: The Committee on Jewish Law and Standards of the Conservative Movement. Edited by Kassel Abelson and David J. Fine, pages 163–65 New York: Rabbinical Assembly, 2002. .
Elliot N. Dorff. "Artificial Insemination, Egg Donation and Adoption." New York: Rabbinical Assembly, 1994. EH 1:3.1994. In Responsa: 1991–2000: The Committee on Jewish Law and Standards of the Conservative Movement. Edited by Kassel Abelson and David J. Fine, pages 461, 497. New York: Rabbinical Assembly, 2002. . (implications of the definition of a firstborn child for who is the mother of a child born by artificial insemination).
Mayer Rabinowitz. "Women Raise Your Hands." New York: Rabbinical Assembly, 1994. OH 128:2.1994a. In Responsa: 1991–2000: The Committee on Jewish Law and Standards of the Conservative Movement. Edited by Kassel Abelson and David J. Fine, pages 9–12. New York: Rabbinical Assembly, 2002. . (implications of redemption of the firstborn for women's participation in the priestly blessing).
Judith S. Antonelli. "The Leviah." In In the Image of God: A Feminist Commentary on the Torah, pages 331–35. Northvale, New Jersey: Jason Aronson, 1995. .
Ellen Frankel. The Five Books of Miriam: A Woman's Commentary on the Torah, pages 197–98. New York: G. P. Putnam's Sons, 1996. .

W. Gunther Plaut. The Haftarah Commentary, pages 327–36. New York: UAHC Press, 1996. .
Sorel Goldberg Loeb and Barbara Binder Kadden. Teaching Torah: A Treasury of Insights and Activities, pages 229–34. Denver: A.R.E. Publishing, 1997. .
Sheryl Nosan. "Beyond Pidyon Ha-ben: Blessings for Giving Life." In The Women's Torah Commentary: New Insights from Women Rabbis on the 54 Weekly Torah Portions. Edited by Elyse Goldstein, pages 255–60. Woodstock, Vermont: Jewish Lights Publishing, 2000. .
Dennis T. Olson. "Numbers." In The HarperCollins Bible Commentary. Edited by James L. Mays, pages 167–69. New York: HarperCollins Publishers, revised edition, 2000. .
Lainie Blum Cogan and Judy Weiss. Teaching Haftarah: Background, Insights, and Strategies, pages 508–18. Denver: A.R.E. Publishing, 2002. .
Michael Fishbane. The JPS Bible Commentary: Haftarot, pages 210–17. Philadelphia: Jewish Publication Society, 2002. .
Robert Alter. The Five Books of Moses: A Translation with Commentary, pages 683–700. New York: W.W. Norton & Co., 2004. .
Nili S. Fox. "Numbers." In The Jewish Study Bible. Edited by Adele Berlin and Marc Zvi Brettler, pages 284–92. New York: Oxford University Press, 2004. .
Rachel Leila Miller. "Haftarat Bamidbar: Hosea 2:1–22." In The Women's Haftarah Commentary: New Insights from Women Rabbis on the 54 Weekly Haftarah Portions, the 5 Megillot & Special Shabbatot. Edited by Elyse Goldstein, pages 161–65. Woodstock, Vermont: Jewish Lights Publishing, 2004. .
Professors on the Parashah: Studies on the Weekly Torah Reading Edited by Leib Moscovitz, pages 233–37. Jerusalem: Urim Publications, 2005. .
W. Gunther Plaut. The Torah: A Modern Commentary: Revised Edition. Revised edition edited by David E.S. Stern, pages 897–920. New York: Union for Reform Judaism, 2006. .
Suzanne A. Brody. "Census." In Dancing in the White Spaces: The Yearly Torah Cycle and More Poems, page 93. Shelbyville, Kentucky: Wasteland Press, 2007. .
Esther Jungreis. Life Is a Test, pages 184–85. Brooklyn: Shaar Press, 2007. .
James L. Kugel. How To Read the Bible: A Guide to Scripture, Then and Now, pages 290, 314. New York: Free Press, 2007. .
The Torah: A Women's Commentary. Edited by Tamara Cohn Eskenazi and Andrea L. Weiss, pages 789–814. New York: URJ Press, 2008. .
R. Dennis Cole. "Numbers." In Zondervan Illustrated Bible Backgrounds Commentary. Edited by John H. Walton, volume 1, pages 341–46. Grand Rapids, Michigan: Zondervan, 2009. .
Reuven Hammer. Entering Torah: Prefaces to the Weekly Torah Portion, pages 195–99. New York: Gefen Publishing House, 2009. .
David Greenstein. "How to Construct a Community: Parashat Bemidbar (Numbers 1:1–4:20)." In Torah Queeries: Weekly Commentaries on the Hebrew Bible. Edited by Gregg Drinkwater, Joshua Lesser, and David Shneer; foreword by Judith Plaskow, pages 187–91. New York: New York University Press, 2009. .
Terence E. Fretheim. "Numbers." In The New Oxford Annotated Bible: New Revised Standard Version with the Apocrypha: An Ecumenical Study Bible. Edited by Michael D. Coogan, Marc Z. Brettler, Carol A. Newsom, and Pheme Perkins, pages 188–94. New York: Oxford University Press, Revised 4th Edition 2010. .
Nicholas P. Lunn. “Numbering Israel: A Rhetorico-Structural Analysis of Numbers 1–4.” Journal for the Study of the Old Testament, volume 35 (number 2) (December 2010): pages 167–85.
Jerry Waite. “The Census of Israelite Men after their Exodus from Egypt.” Vetus Testamentum, volume 60 (number 3) (2010): pages 487–91.
The Commentators' Bible: Numbers: The JPS Miqra'ot Gedolot. Edited, translated, and annotated by Michael Carasik, pages 3–25. Philadelphia: Jewish Publication Society, 2011. .

Calum Carmichael. "Pharaoh and Yahweh as God-Kings (Numbers 1–4)." In The Book of Numbers: A Critique of Genesis, pages 15–25. New Haven: Yale University Press, 2012. .
William G. Dever. The Lives of Ordinary People in Ancient Israel: When Archaeology and the Bible Intersect, page 244. Grand Rapids, Michigan: William B. Eerdmans Publishing Company, 2012. .
Shmuel Herzfeld. "Why I Want To Visit South Korea." In Fifty-Four Pick Up: Fifteen-Minute Inspirational Torah Lessons, pages 193–98. Jerusalem: Gefen Publishing House, 2012. .

Shlomo Riskin. Torah Lights: Bemidbar: Trials and Tribulations in Times of Transition, pages 3–29. New Milford, Connecticut: Maggid Books, 2012. .
Janson C. Condren. “Is the Account of the Organization of the Camp Devoid of Organization? A Proposal for the Literary Structure of Numbers 1.1–10.10.” Journal for the Study of the Old Testament, volume 37 (number 4) (June 2013): pages 423–52.
Avivah Gottlieb Zornberg. Bewilderments: Reflections on the Book of Numbers, pages 3–30. New York: Schocken Books, 2015. .

Jonathan Sacks. Lessons in Leadership: A Weekly Reading of the Jewish Bible, pages 183–87. New Milford, Connecticut: Maggid Books, 2015. .
Jonathan Sacks. Essays on Ethics: A Weekly Reading of the Jewish Bible, pages 215–20. New Milford, Connecticut: Maggid Books, 2016. .
Shai Held. The Heart of Torah, Volume 2: Essays on the Weekly Torah Portion: Leviticus, Numbers, and Deuteronomy, pages 93–102. Philadelphia: Jewish Publication Society, 2017. .
Steven Levy and Sarah Levy. The JPS Rashi Discussion Torah Commentary, pages 113–15. Philadelphia: Jewish Publication Society, 2017. .
Jonathan Sacks. Numbers: The Wilderness Years: Covenant & Conversation: A Weekly Reading of the Jewish Bible, pages 31–70. New Milford, Connecticut: Maggid Books, 2017. .

External links

Texts
Masoretic text and 1917 JPS translation
Hear the parashah chanted
Hear the parashah read in Hebrew

Commentaries

Academy for Jewish Religion, California
Academy for Jewish Religion, New York
Aish.com 
Akhlah: The Jewish Children's Learning Network 
Aleph Beta Academy
American Jewish University — Ziegler School of Rabbinic Studies
Anshe Emes Synagogue, Los Angeles 
Ari Goldwag
Ascent of Safed
Bar-Ilan University
Chabad.org
eparsha.com
G-dcast
The Israel Koschitzky Virtual Beit Midrash
Jewish Agency for Israel
Jewish Theological Seminary
Mechon Hadar
Miriam Aflalo
MyJewishLearning.com
Ohr Sameach
ON Scripture — The Torah
Orthodox Union
OzTorah, Torah from Australia
Oz Ve Shalom — Netivot Shalom
Pardes from Jerusalem
Professor James L. Kugel
Professor Michael Carasik
Rabbi Dov Linzer
Rabbi Fabian Werbin
Rabbi Jonathan Sacks
RabbiShimon.com 
Rabbi Shlomo Riskin
Rabbi Shmuel Herzfeld
Rabbi Stan Levin
Rav Pam
Reconstructionist Judaism 
Sephardic Institute
Shiur.com
613.org Jewish Torah Audio
Tanach Study Center
Teach613.org, Torah Education at Cherry Hill
TheTorah.com
Torah from Dixie 
Torah.org
TorahVort.com
Union for Reform Judaism
United Synagogue of Conservative Judaism
What's Bothering Rashi?
Yeshiva University
Yeshivat Chovevei Torah

Weekly Torah readings in Iyar
Weekly Torah readings in Sivan
Weekly Torah readings from Numbers
Book of Hosea